Michael Anthony O'Neill (born November 3, 1967) is a Canadian former professional ice hockey goaltender who played in the National Hockey League (NHL).

Playing career
O'Neill was born in LaSalle, Quebec. As a youth, he played in the 1979 and 1980 Quebec International Pee-Wee Hockey Tournaments with a minor ice hockey team from LaSalle.

O'Neill played four years at Yale University before spending the 1989–90 season with Tappara Tampere of the SM-liiga. He was drafted 15th overall by the Winnipeg Jets in the 1988 NHL Supplemental Draft while he was at Yale University. He joined the Jets' farm system when he returned to North America in 1990–91.

O'Neill mainly played for the Moncton Hawks of the AHL and the Fort Wayne Komets of the IHL, only playing a few times for the Jets in the 1991–92 and 1992–93 seasons. In the 1993–94 season, he made 17 appearances for the Jets posting a 0–9–1 record. O'Neill returned to the minors and, in 1995–96,  made 74 appearances with the Baltimore Bandits, an AHL record.

O'Neill was signed as a free agent by Anaheim and made his debut on December 11, 1997 against Pittsburgh relieving Mikhail Shtalenkov halfway throu the second period, allowing 3 goals on 10 shots. He played mainly for the Long Beach Ice Dogs in the IHL. He then signed with the Washington Capitals as a free agent in August 1997 and played 47 games for the Portland Pirates of the AHL in 1997–98.

O'Neill played for EC VSV in Austria in the 1998–99 season before returning to North America to play for the Long Beach Ice Dogs and the Michigan K-Wings during 1999–00 season.

In 2000–01, he played for the Sheffield Steelers of the British Ice Hockey Superleague, and won the B&H Cup, the Challenge Cup, the League Championship and the Playoff Championship.

O'Neill retired from professional hockey following the 2000–01 season. O'Neill holds the record for the most career games without a win in a career.

Awards and honors

Career statistics

Regular season and playoffs

References

External links

Hockey Goalies bio

1967 births
Living people
Anglophone Quebec people
Baltimore Bandits players
Canadian ice hockey goaltenders
EC VSV players
Fort Wayne Komets players
Long Beach Ice Dogs (IHL) players
Kalamazoo Wings (1974–2000) players
Mighty Ducks of Anaheim players
Moncton Hawks players
National Hockey League supplemental draft picks
People from LaSalle, Quebec
Phoenix Roadrunners (IHL) players
Portland Pirates players
Sheffield Steelers players
Tappara players
Winnipeg Jets (1979–1996) draft picks
Winnipeg Jets (1979–1996) players
Yale Bulldogs men's ice hockey players
Ice hockey people from Montreal
Canadian expatriate ice hockey players in England
Canadian expatriate ice hockey players in Austria
Canadian expatriate ice hockey players in Finland
AHCA Division I men's ice hockey All-Americans